Nomadic was the name of two ships of the White Star Line:

 
 

Ship names